All Is Well is a 2018 German drama film directed and written by Eva Trobisch.

Cast

Release

Accolades 
Eva Trobisch won the Stockholm Film Festival 2018 award for Best Director with the motivation: "For using a "coherent and subtle film-language (portraying) a character who shrinks her own mental space until there is nothing left, trying to refuse the reality that eats her up from inside."

References

External links 
 
 

2018 films
2018 drama films
German drama films
2010s German-language films
German-language Netflix original films
2010s German films